was a Japanese Thoroughbred racemare which won the 2007 Group One (GI) Tokyo Yūshun (Japanese Derby), the first filly to win this race in 64 years, as well as winning the 2009 Japan Cup. She won seven G1 races in Japan and was the highest earning racemare in Thoroughbred history at the time.

Breeding
Vodka was foaled on 4 April 2004 at Country Bokujo in Hokkaido's Shizunai. She was a bay mare by the 2002 Tokyo Yushun (Derby) winner, Tanino Gimlet out of Tanino Sister by Rousillon (USA).

Racing career
Vodka was owned by Yuzo Tanimizu and trained by Katsuhiko Sumii.

At two years: 2006 
In 2006, Vodka won her first race start and was second in the ungraded Kigiku Sho race which was also contested at the Kyoto Racecourse before she won the G1 Hanshin Juvenile Fillies race at the Hanshin Racecourse. Vodka was then awarded the 2007 JRA Award for Best Two-Year-Old Filly.

At three years:  2007 
In 2007, Vodka won her first start in the ungraded Elfin Stakes, followed by another win in the G3 Tulip Sho, from Daiwa Scarlet, who finished in second place. At her next start on 8 April, in the G1 Oka Sho (Cherry Blossom Awards), the first race of the Japanese Filly Triple Crown, Daiwa Scarlet relegated Vodka into second place. Daiwa Scarlet and Vodka would go on to meet a total of four times that year. Daiwa Scarlet bested her in three of those races. One of those  contests was not a win for Daiwa Scarlet though, in the 2007 G1 Arima Kinen at Nakayama Racecourse, Daiwa Scarlet finished second to Matsurida Gogh, with Vodka finishing 11th.

Vodka's next race start was in the G1 Tokyo Yūshun, also known as the Japanese Derby, the second jewel in the Japanese Triple Crown. Fillies are usually are entered in the Yushun Himba, also known as the Japanese Oaks, which is the second jewel of the Japanese Filly Triple Crown which is a week before the race, however, in a move that shocked the racing world, Vodka won handily, defeating a field of some of the best three-year-old colts in the country. She became the first filly to win the race in 64 years.

Vodka was unplaced in her next start before racing in the G1 Shuka Sho, which is the last race of the Japanese Filly Triple Crown races. Daiwa Scarlet won the race, with Vodka finishing in third place. She was entered in the 2007 Queen Elizabeth II Commemorative Cup, but was scratched a few hours before the race due to what was thought to be a hip problem. In her next start Vodka finished 4th in the G1 Japan Cup Vodka subsequently did not place in her last start of the season.

Despite winning the Japanese Derby. She lost to Daiwa Scarlet in Japanese Champion Three Year old Filly, as Vodka never finished above her in the 3 races in which both horses participated, but the achievement in the Derby led to her receiving the JRA Special award (an award given to horses/person achieved special achievements, usually historical records, not awarded every year). Her 9 race starts of the season resulted in 3 wins, 1 second and 1 third place.

At four years: 2008 
In her first start of the season Vodka was unplaced in the G2 Kyoto Kinen. Vodka went to Dubai in the spring of 2008 to race in the G1 Dubai Duty Free on Dubai World Cup Night. She came in a fast closing fourth. Then upon her return to Japan Vodka narrowly lost the G1 Victoria Mile in May. She next easily won the G1 Yasuda Kinen in June and defeated Daiwa Scarlet in the G1 Tenno Sho (Autumn). Finally that season even though she was heavily favored, she was unable to win the G1 Japan Cup and came in a close third to Screen Hero.

During 2008 Vodka had 8 starts for the above 2 wins, 2 seconds in the G1 Victoria Mile and G2 Mainichi Okan; 1 third in the G1 Japan Cup and 1 fourth in the G1 Dubai Duty Free.

At five years: 2009 
Vodka’s successive wins in the Yasuda Kinen triplicated what had only been achieved twice before, by Sweet Sue in 1952 and 1953 and by Yamanin Zephyr in 1992 and 1993. In the 2009 running, another photo finish decided the winner, in which the five-year-old mare Vodka on her third Japan Cup try with the French jockey Christophe Lemaire won by a nose over the 2008 Kikuka Sho winner Oken Bruce Lee, in a time of 2 minutes and 22.4 seconds, the third-fastest Japan Cup ever run at the standard 2,400-meter distance. Vodka's win would make her the second highest earning racehorse in Japan. Vodka placed 4th in the 2007 running to Admire Moon and 3rd in the 2008 running to Screen Hero, in which the latter ran 13th in the 2009 race. Vodka had a nosebleed during the Japan Cup and was prohibited from racing for a month following her triumphant Japan Cup run according to Japan Racing Association rules.

Her 7 race starts of the season resulted in 3 wins, 1 second and 1 third placing. Vodka was voted Horse of the Year, for the second consecutive year and became the first female to win the title twice.

At six years: 2010
Vodka had her first start on the synthetic Tapeta Footings surface in the Dubai International Racing Carnival Al Maktoum Challenge Round 3 (G2), after racing exclusively on turf in each of her previous 25 starts. In this race she finished eighth and was retired from racing altogether following another nasal bleeding attack.

Her main jockeys included Hirofumi Shii, who rode her in four wins, and Yutaka Take, in three wins. In her final two races Vodka was ridden by Frenchman Christophe Lemaire, who rode her in the Japan Cup victory.

Vodka finished her racing career with a total 10 wins in 22 races in Japan, with wins in seven grade I races, including the 2006 Hanshin Juvenile Fillies, the 2007 Tokyo Yushun (Japanese Derby), the 2008 Yasuda Kinen and Tenno Sho (Autumn), the 2009 Victoria Mile, Yasuda Kinen and Japan Cup. She equalled the record of the Japanese Triple Crown winners Symboli Rudolf and Deep Impact, as well as T.M.Opera O, for the most grade 1 races won in Japan.

Vodka was inducted into the Japan Racing Association Hall of Fame in 2011.

Stud record
Vodka was retired from racing in 2010 and was shipped from Dubai to Ireland to be mated to the 2009 Prix de l'Arc de Triomphe winner, Sea the Stars at the Aga Khan's Gilltown Stud in County Kildare. On 2 May 2011 Vodka foaled a brown colt as a result of this mating. She was subsequently bred back to Sea the Stars, resulting in the following named foals:
 Volare (colt foaled 2011)
 Case by Case (filly foaled 2012)
 Tanino Urban Sea (filly foaled 2013) – winner in Japan

She was also mated to Frankel, producing Tanino Frankel (colt foaled 2015) - placed at Grade III Nakayama Kimpai.

Died on 1 April 2019, from laminitis in Newmarket, Suffolk.  She was 14.

Pedigree

In Popular Cultre 
An anthropomorphized version of Vodka appears in the multimedia franchise Uma Musume Pretty Derby.

See also
List of leading Thoroughbred racehorses
List of historical horses

References

External links

Vodka Becomes Japan's Highest Earning Mare

2004 racehorse births
2019 racehorse deaths
Racehorses bred in Japan
Racehorses trained in Japan
Thoroughbred family 3-l
Japan Cup winners